Boca Juniors refers to the popular Argentine football  club. Other clubs have been named after it, as well as other things:

Boca F.C., football club in Belize
Boca Juniors (Colombia), football club in Colombia (defunct)
Boca Juniors F.C. (Gibraltar), football club in Gibraltar
Boca Juniors FC, football club in Grenada
Boca Río Gallegos, football club in Rio Gallegos, Argentina
Boca Juniors Reserves and Academy, youth academy of the Argentine club
Boca Juniors (basketball), basketball team of the Argentine club
Boca Juniors (women), women's team of the Argentine club